Sir Douglas Lloyd Savory (17 August 1878 – 5 October 1969) was a professor of French and a member of the Parliament of the United Kingdom.

He was born at Palgrave in Suffolk and educated at Marlborough College and St John's College, Oxford. He taught  French and English including at the University of Marburg before becoming Professor of French Language and Romance Philology at Queen's University, Belfast in 1909. In the First World War, he was attached to the Intelligence Division of the Admiralty.

Following the death of Thomas Sinclair, Savory was elected unopposed as Ulster Unionist Member of Parliament (MP) for the seat of Queen's University of Belfast, retiring from his university chair. He held the seat until its abolition in 1950, at which point he was elected for South Antrim, which he represented until 1955. He was knighted in 1952.

He became special investigator into the Katyn massacre of Polish officers in 1940.  He was president of the Huguenot Society of London.

References

1878 births
1969 deaths
UK MPs 1935–1945
UK MPs 1945–1950
UK MPs 1950–1951
UK MPs 1951–1955
Alumni of St John's College, Oxford
Academics of Queen's University Belfast
Katyn massacre investigators
Ulster Unionist Party members of the House of Commons of the United Kingdom
Members of the Parliament of the United Kingdom for County Antrim constituencies (since 1922)
Members of the Parliament of the United Kingdom for Queen's University of Belfast